Takumi Ito (born 3 February 2000) is a Guamanian footballer who plays as a defender for Ezra.

Career

Ito was voted 2017 IIAAG Most Valuable Player. In 2021, he signed for Japanese side Ichikawa SC. Before the 2022 season, he signed for Ezra in Laos.

References

External links

 

2000 births
Association football defenders
Expatriate footballers in Japan
Expatriate footballers in Laos
Guam international footballers
Guamanian footballers
Guamanian people of Japanese descent
Lao Premier League players
Living people
People from Tamuning, Guam